Rachel Sophia Baard is a South African theologian. She is a professor at Union Theological Seminary. She won the 2020 Andrew Murray / Desmond Tutu Book Prize.

She graduated from Stellenbosch University, and Princeton Theological Seminary.
She taught at  Villanova University.

Bibliography

 
 Baard, Rachel (2022). Major Review: A Theology for the Twenty-First Century. Interpretation: A Journal of Bible and Theology 76 (2):165-167.
 
 Sexism and Sin-Talk: Feminist Conversations on the Human Condition, Westminster John Knox Press, 2019.

References

External links 

 Dr. Rachel S. Baard, "Tear Down That Wall!" (Ephesians 2:11-22)

South African theologians
Stellenbosch University alumni
Princeton Theological Seminary alumni
South African women academics
Year of birth missing (living people)
Living people